Caribbean Herpetology is a peer-reviewed open access scientific journal established in 2010. It covers Caribbean herpetology, including evolution, ecology, ethology, biogeography, systematics, and natural history. The editor-in-chief is S. Blair Hedges (Temple University). The journal is abstracted and indexed in BIOSIS Previews and The Zoological Record.

References

External links

Publications established in 2010
English-language journals
Herpetology journals